Liu Wanting and Sun Shengnan were the defending champions, having won the event in 2012. Liu partnered up with Yang Zhaoxuan, but lost in the quarterfinals; Sun partnered up with Chan Chin-wei, but they lost in the semifinals.

Liu Chang and Zhou Yimiao won the title, defeating Misaki Doi and Miki Miyamura in the final, 7–6(7–1), 6–4.

Seeds

Draw

References 
 Draw

Beijing International Challenger - Women's Doubles
2013 Women's Doubles